The 36th Goya Awards ceremony, presented by the Academy of Cinematographic Arts and Sciences (AACCE), honoured the best in Spanish films of 2021 and took place at the Palau de les Arts Reina Sofía in Valencia on 12 February 2022. The ceremony was broadcast by RTVE on La1, TVE Internacional, RTVE Play and RNE.

The shortlists for every category were unveiled on early November, with 160 films being selected to compete. Nominations were read by actors Nathalie Poza and José Coronado on 29 November 2021. The Good Boss received the most nominations with a record-breaking twenty. It was followed by Maixabel, with fourteen nominations, and Parallel Mothers, with eight.

The Good Boss won six awards including Best Film, Best Director for Fernando León de Aranoa, Best Actor for Javier Bardem and Best Original Screenplay.

A new non competitive award that honors personalities from international cinema was introduced for the first time. The first honoree was Australian actress Cate Blanchett.
It featured performances by Joaquín Sabina, Leiva, C. Tangana and Luz Casal. It was the first time that the ceremony was held in Valencia.

Winners and nominees

Honorary Goya
 José Sacristán

International Honorary Goya
 Cate Blanchett

Films with multiple nominations and awards

Presenters and performers 
The following individuals, listed in order of appearance, presented awards or performed musical numbers.

Presenters

Performers

References

External links
 Gala of the 36th Goya Awards on RTVE Play
 Official website

36
2021 film awards
2021 in Spanish cinema
February 2022 events in Spain